Pinchuk.Пінчук, Пинчук is the surname of the following notable people:
Anton Pinchuk, Kazakh heavyweight boxer, gold medalist in Boxing at the 2014 Asian Games – Men's 91 kg
Dmitri Pinchuk (born 1984), Russian professional football player
Mykola Pinchuk (born 1946), retired Soviet and Ukrainian football player
Oleksiy Pinchuk (born 1992), Ukrainian football midfielder
Olena Pinchuk (born 1970), daughter of Ukrainian president Kuchma, founder of ANTIAIDS Foundation, head of the StarLightMedia group supervisory board
Sergei Pinchuk (born 1971), Russian naval officer
Taras Pinchuk (born 1989), professional Ukrainian football defender
Vasili Pinchuk (born 1994), Russian football player
Victor Pinchuk (born 1960), Ukrainian businessman
 Vitaly Iustinovich Pinchuk, binomial authority of Pinchuk's goby (Ponticola cephalargoides), a fish in the Black and the Azov Sea

See also
 

Surnames
Ukrainian-language surnames